Seyyedhasan or Seyyed Hasan may refer to:
Seyyed Hasan, Fars
Seyyed Hasan, Ahvaz, Khuzestan Province
Seyyed Hasan, Shushtar, Khuzestan Province
Seyyed Hasan-e Hakim, Khuzestan Province
Seyyedhasan, Lorestan